Maluba-Lube is a community council located in the Berea District of Lesotho. Its population in 2006 was 21,948.

Villages
The community of Maluba-Lube includes the villages of Ha Bale, Ha Kalaele, Ha Kepi (Lithabaneng), Ha Lekhafola, Ha Mohapinyane, Ha Mohlaetoa, Ha Mokhothu, Ha Molemane, Ha Mopeli, Ha Motjoka, Ha Motseremeli, Ha Mphele, Ha Nkalimeng, Ha Ntjabane, Ha Ramajoro, Ha Ramonaheng, Ha Ratšiu, Ha Tebeli, Khoaba-Lea-Bua, Korokoro, Lecop, Lithabaneng and Ntširele (Ha Motjoka).

References

External links
 Google map of community villages

Populated places in Berea District